Colin Frederick Bailey, QPM (born 17 October 1943) was, between 1995 and 2000, the Chief Constable of Nottinghamshire Constabulary.

Bailey was educated at Queen Elizabeth's Grammar School, Horncastle and the University of Sheffield. He was with the Lincolnshire Constabulary from 1960 to 1986. He was Assistant Chief Constable  of West Yorkshire Police from 1986 to 1990; and Deputy Chief Constable of Nottinghamshire Constabulary from 1990 to 1995.

References

1943 births
Living people
British Chief Constables
English recipients of the Queen's Police Medal
People educated at Queen Elizabeth's Grammar School, Horncastle
Alumni of the University of Sheffield
Nottinghamshire